Abraham (Aapo) Inkinen (24 September 1898, Kuolemajärvi - 23 January 1960) was a Finnish farmer and politician. He was a member of the Parliament of Finland from 1939 to 1948, representing the Agrarian League.

References

1898 births
1960 deaths
People from Vyborg District
People from Viipuri Province (Grand Duchy of Finland)
Centre Party (Finland) politicians
Members of the Parliament of Finland (1939–45)
Members of the Parliament of Finland (1945–48)
Finnish people of World War II